Dolina is a village in the Municipality of Puconci in the Prekmurje region of Slovenia.

References

External links 
Dolina on Geopedia

Populated places in the Municipality of Puconci